David Radosta (born 12 November 1990) is a Czech football player who currently plays for Vlašim on loan from FK Dukla Prague. Radosta made his first-team début for Dukla in a 2010 Czech Cup match against Česká Lípa.

References

External links
 
 

Czech footballers
1990 births
Living people
FK Dukla Prague players
SK Kladno players
Association football midfielders
FC Sellier & Bellot Vlašim players